Thrumster is a crofting township on the main A99 road between Wick and Inverness. It is the nearest village to Wick. The transmission mast used to broadcast BBC television and radio signals to Caithness was located here until 1960.

The village had a railway station until trains stopped running on the Wick and Lybster Railway in 1944. The station has been preserved.

Features
Near Thrumster House is a standing stone, that affirms the legend that Margaret, Maid of Norway, Norwegian princess, who was heiress of the Scottish Town, was wrecked on this coast on her return to Scotland, and buried under the Standing-Stane o' Thrumster.

References

Populated places in Caithness